Küss Mich, Meine Liebe is a compilation album by Shit and Shine, released on 16 June 2008 by Load Records.

Track listing

Personnel
Adapted from the Küss Mich, Meine Liebe liner notes.
Shit and Shine
 Craig Clouse – vocals, instruments
Production and additional personnel
 Pete Simonelli – vocals (7)

Release history

References

External links 
 

2008 compilation albums
Shit and Shine albums
Load Records albums